Ambinanifaho is a municipality in northern Madagascar. It belongs to the district of Antalaha, which is a part of Sava Region. According to 2001 census the population of Ambinanifaho was 6,573.

Primary and junior level secondary education are available in town. The majority 99% of the population are farmers.  The most important crop is vanilla, while other important products are coffee, cloves and rice.  Services provide employment for 1% of the population.

References and notes 

Populated places in Sava Region